Sister Marion Beiter  (August 23, 1907 –  October 11, 1982), born Dorothy Katharine Beiter, was an American mathematician and educator. Her research focused on the area of cyclotomic polynomials.

Beiter was born in Buffalo to Kathryn and Edward Frederick Beiter, where she attended Sacred Heart Academy. She entered the Sisters of St. Francis of Penance and Christian Charity in 1923, and professed her final vows in 1929.

She began her career in 1925 as a teacher in parochial and private schools, continuing in this capacity until 1952, when she was appointed chairwoman of the mathematics department of Rosary Hill College. She meanwhile graduated from Canisius College (1944) and St. Bonaventure University (1948), before obtaining a PhD from the Catholic University of America in 1960. Besides a sabbatical year at the State University of New York at Buffalo in 1971–1972, Beiter remained at Rosary Hill until her retirement in May 1977.

Beiter died in 1982 of a series of strokes.

Publications

References

1907 births
1982 deaths
20th-century American educators
American women mathematicians
Canisius College alumni
Catholic University of America alumni
Daemen College
Franciscans
Mathematicians from New York (state)
Scientists from Buffalo, New York
St. Bonaventure University alumni